Thearne is a hamlet in the East Riding of Yorkshire, England, in the civil parish of Woodmansey.

It also lies just to the west of the River Hull.

Geography

The original village is located at the meeting of three minor roads: Thearne Road (now Ferry Lane) and Thearne Lane (formerly Old Wire Carr Road) to the west, and Ferry Lane to the east. The modern place includes additional housing along the A1174.

There are several developments of glasshouse based agriculture in the area.

Governance
The hamlet was in the Beverley and Holderness parliamentary constituency until the 2010 general election when it was transferred to the constituency of Haltemprice and Howden.

History
The name 'Thearne' is a reference to the Thorn tree and was recorded as early as the late 13th century. A ferry east of Thearne across the River Hull dates to at least the 12th century. In the 15th century a chapel dedicated to the Blessed Virgin was established. The chapel was confiscated during Henry VIII's suppression, and is no longer in existence.

Flooding of the Beverley-Hull road led to orders for an improvement of the area's drainage in the 17th century. The land around Thearne was enclosed by and act of 1788. The Beverley and Barmston Drain was constructed through the area in around 1800, but does not actively drain Thearne. A windmill for corn, Thearne Windmill, south-west of the village on the Beverley-Hull road was constructed sometime around 1800. An earlier mill existed in the 17th century, the new mill had steam power installed in 1856.

In 1821 the population of Thearne was 90; by around 1833 the township had a population of 67. In the 1850s Thearne consisted of less than 10 main buildings, including Thearne Hall (built ). A Primitive Methodist chapel was built in 1867. Ferry Road led east to the River Hull where the ferry ('Waghen ferry' later 'Wawne Ferry') crossed to the Anchor Inn (later the Windham Arms), and to the road to Wawne.

By the 1920s Thearne Windmill was out of use. The ferry closed in August 1946 when the Windham Arms Public House at Wawne, from where it operated, was sold to Moors' and Robson's Brewery. Their new tenant, Walter Twidale, reported that the ferry boat was no longer safe to use, as recorded by Ronald Dixon, the chairman of Woodmansey Parish Council, in the council minutes of December 1946. A waste water treatment works for Woodmansey and Thearne was constructed in the 1950s, north-east of the village. The Methodist chapel closed in 1968.

Glasshouse agriculture developed extensively around Wawne in the second half of the 20th century.

References

Sources

External links

Villages in the East Riding of Yorkshire
Holderness